Nathan Wonsley Jr. (born December 7, 1963 in Moss Point, Mississippi) is a retired American football running back in the National Football League and a current bodybuilder. He was signed by the Tampa Bay Buccaneers as an undrafted free agent in 1986. He played college football at Mississippi.

Wonsley has two brothers, Otis Wonsley and George Wonsley, who were also running backs in the NFL.

External links
Tampa Bay Buccaneers bio

1963 births
Living people
American football running backs
Ole Miss Rebels football players
Tampa Bay Buccaneers players
American bodybuilders
People from Moss Point, Mississippi
Players of American football from Mississippi
Ed Block Courage Award recipients